Abdul Basit is a retired Pakistani diplomat who served as the former high commissioner of Pakistan to India. He was appointed to his position in 2014 and was based at the Pakistani High Commission in New Delhi. Previously, he served as Pakistan's ambassador to Germany from May 2012 to March 2014. During his career, he has been posted at Moscow, New York, Sana'a, Geneva and London.

Work

References

Ambassadors of Pakistan to Germany
High Commissioners of Pakistan to India
Pakistani expatriates in Russia
Pakistani expatriates in the United States
Pakistani expatriates in Yemen
Pakistani expatriates in Switzerland
Pakistani expatriates in England
Year of birth missing (living people)
Living people
Quaid-i-Azam University alumni